Josué Amaral Teixeira (born 25 August 1960) is a Brazilian professional football manager. He is the current head coach of Tuna Luso.

Managerial career
He is the current head coach of Macaé, where he led the team to the title of the Serie C, beating traditional teams like Fortaleza, in a crowded Castelão. the CRB winning the first game 4-0 and Paysandu, while achieving a draw with goals away from home, within the Mangueirão.

Honours
 Al-Gharafa
 Qatar Stars League: 2007–08

 Sampaio Corrêa
 Campeonato Maranhense: 2011

 Ríver
 Campeonato Piauiense: 2014

 Macaé
 Campeonato Brasileiro Série C: 2014

References

1964 births
Living people
Sportspeople from Niterói
Brazilian football managers
Campeonato Brasileiro Série A managers
Campeonato Brasileiro Série B managers
Campeonato Brasileiro Série C managers
Campeonato Brasileiro Série D managers
Fluminense FC managers
Avaí FC managers
Al-Gharafa SC managers
Al-Rayyan SC managers
Nova Iguaçu Futebol Clube managers
Sampaio Corrêa Futebol Clube managers
Duque de Caxias Futebol Clube managers
Esporte Clube Flamengo managers
Macaé Esporte Futebol Clube managers
Ríver Atlético Clube managers
ABC Futebol Clube managers
Cuiabá Esporte Clube managers
Clube do Remo managers
Americano Futebol Clube managers
America Football Club (RJ) managers
Tuna Luso Brasileira managers